American Drug War: The Last White Hope is a 2007 documentary film by writer and director Kevin Booth about the war on drugs in the United States.

Synopsis 
The film holds the view that the war on drugs has become one of the longest, darkest, most costly periods in American history. Texas filmmaker Kevin Booth sets out to prove his claim that the Drug War has failed. Three and a half years in the making, the film includes sections showing 62 people including former DEA agents, CIA officers, narcotics officers, judges, politicians, gang members, prisoners, and celebrities. There is also extensive treatment of CIA and Contras cocaine trafficking in the US.

Awards 
 2007 Artivist Film Festival, Best Feature, Intl. Human Rights
 2007 Silver Lake Film Festival, Best Documentary
 2007 DIY Film Fest, Best Documentary 
 2006 Evil City, Best Documentary

Television 
 Picked up by Showtime in March 2008 to be aired for the next two years.
 Shown on Australia's Foxtel Crime & Investigation Network.

See also
 Breaking the Taboo, 2011 documentary
 Chasing the Scream: The First and Last Days of the War on Drugs, 2015 book

References

External links 
 AmericanDrugWar.com
 
 

Drug control law in the United States
Drug policy reform
Drug policy of the United States
American documentary films
Documentary films about the illegal drug trade
Films about cocaine
2007 documentary films
2007 films
Cocaine in the United States
2000s English-language films
2000s American films